Waterdown District High School is located at 215 Parkside Drive, Waterdown, Ontario, and is a member of the Hamilton-Wentworth District School Board.

Background
A high school was first established in the Waterdown District in 1853. 

Prior to the 2012 school year, the school saw an expansion of its facilities to accommodate new home construction.

In 2017, Waterdown teacher Rob Flosman won a Governor General's Award for creating a history museum inside of the school. The student-run museum opened in 2013 and contained over 700 artifacts.

References

External links
Waterdown District High School profile
Waterdown District High School

High schools in Hamilton, Ontario
Educational institutions established in 1993
1993 establishments in Ontario